John Alexander Samford (August 29, 1905 – December 1, 1968) was a lieutenant general in the United States Air Force who served as Director of the National Security Agency.

Early life and education
Samford was born at Hagerman, New Mexico, in 1905. He graduated from high school in 1922 and then spent one year at Columbia University in New York City. In 1924, he received a senatorial appointment to the United States Military Academy. He graduated in 1928, 131st in a class of 260.

Military career
Samford's first assignment was that of a student officer at Brooks Field, Texas. In 1929, he received his pilot wings at Kelly Field and was eventually rated a command pilot.

Samford was next assigned to Fort Crockett, located at Galveston, Texas. In 1930, he returned to Kelly Field where he served as a flying instructor. In 1934, he was ordered to an Engineering and Armament School at Chanute Field, Illinois. From 1935 until 1942, he held various assignments in Panama, Virginia, Louisiana and Florida.

Samford was assistant chief of staff, G-1, Headquarters Third Air Force, in Tampa, Florida, when appointed chief of staff of the VIII Air Force Composite Command located in Northern Ireland.

In 1943, Samford was appointed deputy chief of staff of the Eighth Air Force, and later chief of staff of the VIII Bomber Command.

In 1944, Samford was promoted to brigadier general and appointed chief of staff of the Eighth Air Force. In October 1944 he was appointed deputy assistant chief of staff, A-2, Headquarters U.S. Army Air Forces.

In January 1947, Samford was appointed commander, 24th Composite Wing which soon thereafter became the Antilles Air Division of the Caribbean Air Command.

In May 1949, Samford was appointed commandant of the Air Command and Staff School. He was promoted to major general in 1950 and held a brief appointment as commandant of the Air War College before being appointed director of intelligence for the United States Air Force.

It was during Samford's tenure as director of Air Force intelligence that Project Blue Book, which investigated unidentified flying objects (UFOs) was started. On July 29, 1952, Samford conducted a press conference at the Pentagon related to UFOs. Samford was mentioned at the beginning of the 1956 film UFO which examined the phenomena of unidentified flying objects.

Samford served as Vice Director of the National Security Agency from June to August 1956. In November, Samford was appointed director of the National Security Agency and promoted to lieutenant general. He held this post until his retirement on November 23, 1960. His successor as NSA director was Admiral Laurence H. Frost. He died on November 20, 1968, in Washington, DC.

Awards
Command Pilot Wings
Army Distinguished Service Medal
Legion of Merit with oak leaf cluster
Air Medal
American Defense Service Medal
American Campaign Medal
European-African-Middle Eastern Campaign Medal
World War II Victory Medal
National Defense Service Medal
Officer, Legion of Honor (France)

References

External links
 

1905 births
1968 deaths
American aviators
Aviators from New Mexico
People from Chaves County, New Mexico
United States Air Force generals
United States Army personnel of World War II
Directors of the National Security Agency
United States Military Academy alumni
Deputy Directors of the National Security Agency
Mackay Trophy winners
Recipients of the Distinguished Service Medal (US Army)